The Slovenian First League of Handball, currently named Liga NLB due to sponsorship reasons, is the top team handball league in Slovenia. It is organized by the Handball Federation of Slovenia (Rokometna Zveza Slovenije). The league comprises fourteen teams.

Names
Since 1991, the league has been named after sponsors on several occasions, giving it the following names: 
1. SRL (1991–2002)
Liga Siol (2002–2004)
Liga Telekom (2004–2006)
MIK 1. Liga (2006–2010)
1. NLB Leasing liga (2011–2016)
 Liga NLB (2017–present)

Clubs
As of the 2022–23 season
Celje
Dobova
Gorenje Velenje
Jeruzalem Ormož
Koper
Krka
Krško
Loka
Maribor Branik
Ribnica
Slovan
Slovenj Gradec 2011
SVIŠ
Trimo Trebnje

List of seasons

EHF coefficient

The table shows the position of Slovenian League, based on its EHF coefficient ranking.

Country ranking
EHF league ranking for the 2019–20 season

10.  (8)  Croatian Premijer liga (32.00)
11.  (11)  Liga Națională (30.44)
12.  (10)  Liga NLB (29.33)
13.  (14)  Ukrainian Men's Handball Super League (26.11)
14.  (15)  Handbollsligan (25.56)

References

External links
Handball Federation of Slovenia 

Sports leagues in Slovenia
Slovenia
Handball competitions in Slovenia
1991 establishments in Slovenia
Sports leagues established in 1991
Professional sports leagues in Slovenia